The River Wyre in Lancashire, England, flows into the Irish Sea at Fleetwood. It is 28 miles (45 km) long and has a sheltered estuary which penetrates deep into the Fylde peninsula.

Etymology
The name Wyre is of pre-Roman, likely if specific, Common Brittonic origin. It may be derived from *wiΣ-, a form of the element , with a basic sense of "flowing", with the suffix .

The River Wyre possibly shares its etymology with other river names, including the Wear in County Durham and the Quair Water in Scotland.

The river's name possibly means 'winding river' in Celtic.

Geography

The river rises in the Forest of Bowland in central Lancashire, as two distinct tributaries, the Tarnbrook Wyre and the Marshaw Wyre, whose confluence is near the  village of Abbeystead. In 1984 a pumping station, built just below the confluence as part of a water transfer scheme in the 1980s, saw the Abbeystead disaster, an explosion in which 16 people were killed and a further 22 were injured.

From Abbeystead, the river flows south through Dolphinholme to Garstang, where the Lancaster Canal crosses on a small aqueduct.  One mile south, at Catterall, it meets its first major tributary, the River Calder. The river then turns westwards, flowing through St Michael's on Wyre where it is joined by its second major tributary, the River Brock. It becomes tidal below the weir at St Michael's.

It is crossed by Cartford Bridge, a toll bridge, between Little Eccleston and Out Rawcliffe. A former toll bridge, Shard Bridge, close to Poulton-le-Fylde, has been rebuilt and is now free. A pedestrian ferry runs between Fleetwood and Knott End but the ferry to the Isle of Man no longer runs.

Major industry existed at the former ICI site at Burn Naze, close to the estuary of the river. It was originally an alkali works taking brine from mines and wells across the river in and around Preesall. Later processes undertaken on the site included those dealing with vinyl chloride monomer, although this was later moved to Runcorn and ICI activity on the site ceased. Industrial activity by a number of various companies continues by the river, albeit on a much reduced scale.

The area around Burn Naze on the western side of the Wyre Estuary was formerly known as Bergerode, believed to be an Old English term for "shallow harbour", beor grade.

From Skippool, just downstream of Shard Bridge, to Fleetwood, the banks of the river form the Wyre Estuary Country Park. Facilities exist on the western bank. The park has its headquarters at Stanah. It has been the recipient of a Green Flag Award.

Fleetwood at the mouth of the river was a major fishing port up until the latter part of the 20th century. Wyre Dock was built there between 1869 and 1877. With the decline in the size of the fleet, most of the dock complex has subsequently been converted to a marina and the adjacent Affinity Lancashire outdoor shopping centre.

The river drains a total catchment area of approximately 175 square miles (450 km²).

The Wyre is the only one of the major Lancashire rivers that flows wholly within the ceremonial county; the Ribble starts in North Yorkshire, and the Lune starts in Cumbria.

Settlements

River Wyre

Fleetwood
Knott End-on-Sea
Stanah
Thornton
Hambleton
Skippool
Little Singleton
Out Rawcliffe
Little Eccleston
Great Eccleston
St Michael's on Wyre
Churchtown
Catterall
Garstang
Cabus
Scorton
Hollins Lane
Dolphinholme
Abbeystead

Marshaw Wyre
Marshaw

Tarnbrook Wyre
Lower Lee
Tarnbrook

Tributaries

River Wyre
Hillylaid Pool
Wardley's Pool
Peg's Pool
Skippool Creek
Main Dyke
Lucas Flash
Calder Brook
Wall Mill Pool
Thistleton Brook
Medlar Brook
Scholar Brook
River Brock
Yoad Pool
New Draught
Old River Brock
Bacchus Brook
Bull Brook
Withney Dike
Woodplumpton Brook
Swill Brook
Blundel Brook
New Mill Brook
Barton Brook
Dean Brook
Sparling Brook
Factory Brook
Westfield Brook
Mill Brook
Whinnyclough Brook
Bullsnape Brook
Blay Brook
Lickhurst Brook
Huds Brook
Winsnape Brook
Clough Heads Brook
Longback Brook
Ains Pool
River Calder
Little Calder River
Nanny Brook
Calder Dyke
East Grain
North Grain
Parkhead Brook
Grizedale Brook
Oxen Beck
Tithe Barn Brook
Park Brook
Foxhouses Brook
Lordshouse Brook
Street Brook
Damas Gill
Sparrow Gill
Caw Brook
Smithy Beck
Gallows Clough
Hall Gill
Parson's Brook
Joshua's Beck
Cam Brook
Lainsley Slack

Marshaw Wyre
Marshaw Wyre
Inchaclough
White Syke
Bull Beck
Well Brook
Meer Brook
Black Clough
Tail Clough
Trough Brook
Threapshaw Clough

Tarnbrook Wyre
Tarnbrook Wyre
River Grizedale
Castle Syke
Grizedale Brook
Lower Within Syke
Higher Within Syke
Wood Syke
Stick Close Beck
Thorn Clough
Fall Clough
Tarn Syke
Thrush Clough
Higher Syke
Delph Beck
White Moor Clough
Swine Clough
Deer Clough
Small Clough
Gavells Clough
Hare Syke

See also 

 Wyre Way

Notes

References

External links

The River Wyre in Garstang
A great sea fishing venue the Wyre estuary is a favourite of local sea angling clubs

Rivers of the Borough of Wyre
River Wyre
Rivers of Lancaster
River Wyre
Rivers of Lancashire